To Age or Not to Age is a documentary film directed by Robert Kane Pappas with Steven N. Austad, Ph.D., Rev. Nicanor Pier Giorgio Austriaco, O.P., Ph.D., Nir Barzilai, M.D., Troy Duster, Aubrey de Grey, Leonard P. Guarente, Cynthia Kenyon, Tom Kirkwood, Gordon Lithgow, Ph.D., David Sinclair and Christoph Westphal. The screenwriter was Robert Kane Pappas. The film was produced by Miriam Foley and Joseph Zock. The film opened at the Village East Cinema in New York City on July 16, 2010.

Cast
Steven N. Austad, Ph.D.
Rev. Nicanor Pier Giorgio Austriaco, O.P., Ph.D.
Nir Barzilai, M.D.
Troy Duster, Ph.D.
Aubrey de Grey, Ph.D.
Leonard P. Guarente, Ph.D.
Cynthia Kenyon, Ph.D.
Dr. Thomas Kirkwood
Gordon Lithgow, Ph.D.
David Sinclair, Ph.D.
Christoph Westphal, Ph.D.

References

External links
Official website
Official Twitter page
Official Facebook page

2010 films
Documentary films about old age
2010 documentary films
American documentary films
2010s English-language films
2010s American films